Zemplén may refer to:
 Zemplén County, a historical region of the Kingdom of Hungary
 the part of the historical region in present-day Hungary, now part of the Borsod-Abaúj-Zemplén county
 Géza Zemplén, Hungarian chemist

See also
Borsod-Abaúj-Zemplén
Zemplén Mountains (in Hungary)
Zemplín (disambiguation)